The following is a list of currently operating hospitals in Sudan.  As of 2019, there were a total of 272 hospitals in Sudan.

See also
 Arabic: List of hospitals in Sudan
 Health in Sudan

References

Hospitals
Sudan

Sudan